The Presbyterian Church in Korea (ChanYang) was formed in 1987 by Pastor Park Jong-Hwa. Five Presbyteries were established and founded the denomination in El Bethel Church (ChangYang) in 1988. It has 13,748 members in 57 congregations and 8 Presbyteries and a General Assembly. The Apostles Creed and the Westminster Confession are the official standards. There is no female ordination of pastors. Member of the World Communion of Reformed Churches.

References 

Presbyterian denominations in South Korea
Christian organizations established in 1987